San Giovanni Incarico is a comune (municipality) in the Province of Frosinone in the Italian region Lazio, located about  southeast of Rome and about  southeast of Frosinone.

San Giovanni Incarico borders the following municipalities: Arce, Ceprano, Colfelice, Falvaterra, Pastena, Pico, Pontecorvo, Roccasecca.

References

External links
 Official website

Cities and towns in Lazio